The 2009 Moscow Victory Parade was held on Victory Day on the 64th anniversary of the Great Patriotic War, which ended in the defeat of Nazi Germany. The parade was commanded by Valery Gerasimov, commander of the Moscow Military District, and reviewed by Anatoliy Serdyukov of the Russian Ministry of Defence. A speech was made by the third president of Russia, Dmitry Medvedev, in which he warned other countries against embarking on military adventures. This was thought to be a veiled warning directed at Georgian President Mikhail Saakashvili. The Defense Ministry noted that the air parade is a de facto dress rehearsal for the jubilee parade that followed in honor of the 65th anniversary of Victory.

Forces at the Parade 
Note: Those indicated in bold indicate first parade appearance, those indicated with italic indicate double or multiple parade appearances.
 Colonel General Valery Gerasimov, Commander of the Moscow Military District (parade commander)
 Defense Minister of the Russian Federation Anatoliy Serdyukov (parade inspector)

Military Bands in Attendance
 Massed Military Bands led and conducted by Major General Valery Khalilov and composed of:
 Headquarters Band of the Moscow Military District
 Central Military Band of the MDRF 
 Headquarters Band, of the Ministry of Internal Affairs of the Russian Federation
 Central Band of the Russian Navy
 Band of the Moscow Military Conservatoire, Military University of the Ministry of Defense of the Russian Federation
 HQ Band of the Ministry of Emergency Situations of the Russian Federation
 Band of the Combined Arms Academy of the Armed Forces of the Russian Federation
 Corps of Drums of the Moscow Military Conservatoire, Military University of the Ministry of Defense of the Russian Federation

Infantry Column 
 154th Moscow Garrison Commandant's Honor Guard Regiment and Color Guards
 Colors Party composed of:
 Flag of Russia
 Victory Banner
 Banner of the Armed Forces of the Russian Federation
 Combined Honor Guards Company of the Armed Forces
Representative units of the Armed Forced, Ministry of Internal Affairs, Ministry of Emergency Situations and Civil Defense, Federal Security Service as well as units of the Moscow Military District
Combined Arms Academy of the Armed Forces of the Russian Federation
 Military University of the Ministry of Defense of the Russian Federation
 Peter the Great Military Academy of the Strategic Missile Forces
 Gagarin Air Force Academy
 Zhukovsky Air Force Engineering Academy
 Air Force Gen. Staff School of Rocket Forces and Anti-Air Defense Training
 Baltic Naval Military Institute "Admiral Fyodor Ushakov"
 336th Separate Bialystok Guards Naval Infantry Brigade of the Baltic Fleet
 Moscow Military Space Institute of Radio Electronics
 Ryazan Airborne Command Academy "Gen. of the Army Vasily Margelov"
 Guards Airborne Regiment
 Civil Defense Academy of the Ministry of Emergency Situations of the Russian Federation
 Military Technological University
 5th Tamanskaya Guards Ind. Motor Rifle Brigade "Mikhail Kalinin"
 4th Kantemir Guards Armored Brigade "Yuri Andropov"
 27th Sevastopol Guards Motor Rifle Brigade
 ODON Ind. Motorized Internal Troops Division of the Ministry of Internal Affairs of the Russian Federation "Felix Dzerzhinsky"
 Moscow Border Guards Institute of the Border Guard Service of the Federal Security Service of the Russian Federation "Moscow City Council"
 Moscow Military Commanders Training School "Supreme Soviet of the RSFSR/Russian Federation"

With more than 9,000 soldier, sailors, and airmen and 100 vehicles marching in the parade, this was the largest such parade held in Russia since the fall of the Soviet Union.

Unlike previous Victory Day parades, there were no units parading in Great Patriotic War uniforms, though the Victory Banner was paraded at the beginning of the ceremony.

Ground vehicles at the Parade 

This was only the second time since the fall of the Soviet Union when armoured fighting vehicles took part in the Red Square parade.

Vehicles in the parade included:

 UAZ-469
 GAZ-2975
 BTR-80
 BMP-3
 BMD-4
 Sprut anti-tank gun
 T-90A
 2S19 Msta
 9K22 Tunguska
 Tor Missile System
 Buk-M1-2
 BM-30 Smerch
 S-300
 Iskander M
 RT-2PM Topol

Aircraft at the Parade 
 Kamov Ka-52
 Mil Mi-24
 Mil Mi-8
 Mil Mi-26
 Antonov An-124
 Beriev A-50
 Sukhoi Su-27
 Tupolev Tu-160
 Mikoyan MiG-31
 Tupolev Tu-95
 Ilyushin Il-78
 Mikoyan MiG-29
 Sukhoi Su-24
 Sukhoi Su-34
 Tupolev Tu-22M
 Sukhoi Su-25
 Sukhoi Su-27 and 4 Mikoyan MiG-29 of the Russian Knights and Strizhi

Music 

 Flag procession, Inspection, and Address
 March of the Preobrazhensky Regiment (Марш Преображенского Полка) by Unknown
 Slow March of the Tankmen (Встречный Марш Танкистов) by Semyon Tchernetsky
 Slow March to Carry the War Flag (Встречный Марш для выноса Боевого Знамени) by Dmitriy Valentinovich Kadeyev
 Slow March of the Guards of the Navy (Гвардейский Встречный Марш Военно-Морского Флота) by Nikolai Pavlocich Ivanov-Radkevich
 Slow March of the Officers Schools (Встречный Марш офицерских училищ) by Semyon Tchernetsky
 Slow March (Встречный Марш) by Dmitry Pertsev
 Slow March of the Red Army (Встречный Марш Красной Армии) by Semyon Tchernetsky
 Slow March (Встречный Марш) by Evgeny Aksyonov
 Glory (Славься) by Mikhail Glinka
 Parade Fanfare All Listen! (Парадная Фанфара "Слушайте все!") by Andrei Golovin
 State Anthem of the Russian Federation (Государственный Гимн Российской Федерации) by Alexander Alexandrov
 Signal Retreat (Сигнал "Отбой")

 Infantry Column
 Farewell of Slavianka (Прощание Славянки) by Vasiliy Agapkin
 In Defense of the Homeland (В защиту Родины) by Viktor Sergeyevich Runov
 Air March (Авиамарш) by Yuliy Abramovich Khait
 Crew is One Family (Экипаж - одна семья) by Viktor Vasilyevich Pleshak
 We Need One Victory (Нам Нужна Одна Победа) by Bulat Shalvovich Okudzhava
 March Kant (Марш "Кант") by Valery Khalilov
 On Guard for the Peace (На страже Мира) by Boris Alexandrovich Diev
 To Serve Russia (Служить России) by Eduard Cemyonovich Khanok
 Victory Day (День Победы) by David Fyodorovich Tukhmanov

 Vehicle Column
 General Miloradovich ("Генерал Милорадович") by Valery Khalilov
 Triumph of the Winners (Триумф Победителей)
 Katyusha (Катюша) by Matvey Blanter
 Artillery March (Марш Артиллеристов) by Tikhon Khrennikov
 March Hero (Марш "Герой")

 Flypast Column
 Air March (Авиамарш) by Yuliy Abramovich Khait
 March Airplanes – First of all (Марш "Первым делом самолёты") by Vasili-Solovyov-Sedoi
 Air March (Авиамарш) by Yuliy Abramovich Khait
 March Airplanes – First of all (Марш "Первым делом самолёты") by Vasili-Solovyov-Sedoi

 Conclusion
 Long Live our State (Да здравствует наша держава) by Boris Alexandrov
 Song of the Russian Army (Песня о Российской Армии) by Alexander Alexandrov

References

See also
2008 Moscow Victory Day Parade
2010 Moscow Victory Day Parade
60th Anniversary of the People's Republic of China
Millennial Anniversary of Hanoi

Moscow Victory Day Parades
Moscow Victory Day Parade
2009 in military history
2009 in Moscow
May 2009 events in Russia